(Zgf or ZF) is a rank of the enlisted men rank group (EN group) in the Austrian Bundesheer. In comparison to the German Bundeswehr it is equivalent to the EN-rank “Oberstabsgefreiter”. A Zugsführer might be tasked to lead a sub-subunit of 8 to 13 soldiers.

During United Nations missions and in NATO Partnership for Peace the rank Zugsführer will be designated in English with Master Corporal (MCpl) and is equivalent to NATO-Rang code OR-4.

Austria-Hungaria (until 1918) 
The Zugsführer rank was derived from the former platoon corporal (de: Zugskorporal) in 1857 and introduced to the Austro-Hungarian armed forces (hu: „Szakaszvezetö“). The rank was equivalent to the German NCO-grade Sergeant. The Zugsführer was authorized to wear yellow-black NCO port epée.

Depending on the armed forces branch, service, or assignment the Zugsführer rank (with the appropriate rank I insignia) was equivalent to:
Stabführer (en: Tambour major)
Kurschmied (en: Health smith, cavalry shoeing)
Rechnungs-Unteroffizier 2. Klasse (en: Fiscal NCO 2nd class; hu: Számvivö altiszt)
Waffenmeister 2. Klasse (en: Weapon master 2nd class)

See also
 Ranks of the Austrian Bundesheer
 Rank insignias of the Austro-Hungarian armed forces

References 

 Die Streitkräfte der Republik Österreich, 1918-1968, Heeresgeschichtliches Museum, Militärwissenschaftliches Institut, 1968.

Military ranks of Austria